Barbara Schurz (Russian transliteration: Барбара Шурц) (born 1973) is an Austrian artist and self-described "revolutionary activist".

Life and work

At Vienna University she pursued Slavic Studies and Women's Studies.  Subsequently, she studied conceptual art at the Vienna Academy of Fine Arts. She began traveling around the world, living as an artist and author in Moscow and Berlin, in addition to Vienna.

Schurz is best known for her books, co-written with Alexander Brener, that address the boundary between art and politics from an activist perspective.  These are heavily influenced by poststructuralism, particularly the writings of Michel Foucault, and focus their attacks largely on capitalism and imperialism.  Schurz accompanied Brener to the 'Violence to Endurance: Extreme Curating' art lecture at the ICA to both protest and involve themselves in the lecture.  While there Brener defecated in front of the audience while Schurz threw peanuts at the lecturers.

Books
 Was tun? (1999)
 Furzende Völker (2000)
 Tattoos auf Gefängnissen (2001)
 Bukaka Spat Here (2001, Austria, ; 2002, UK)

References

1973 births
Living people
21st-century Austrian women artists
Austrian contemporary artists
Academy of Fine Arts Vienna alumni